The Battle of Cape St. Vincent (14 February 1797) was one of the opening battles of the Anglo-Spanish War (1796–1808), as part of the French Revolutionary Wars, where a British fleet under Admiral Sir John Jervis defeated a greatly superior Spanish fleet under Admiral Don José de Córdoba y Ramos near Cape St. Vincent, Portugal.

Background

After the signing of the Treaty of San Ildefonso in 1796 allying Spanish and French forces against Great Britain, the British Navy blockaded Spain in 1797, impairing communications with its Spanish Empire. The Spanish declaration of war on Britain and Portugal in October 1796 made the British position in the Mediterranean untenable. The combined Franco-Spanish fleet of 38 ships of the line heavily outnumbered the British Mediterranean Fleet of fifteen ships of the line, forcing the British to evacuate their positions in first Corsica and then Elba. Early in 1797, the Spanish fleet of 27 ships of the line, which were supposed to join the French fleet at Brest lay at Cartagena, on the Mediterranean Sea, with the intention of sailing to Cádiz as an escort of a 57 merchant convoy, carrying mainly mercury—necessary for gold and silver production – which would eventually enter that Spanish harbour along with warships Neptuno, Terrible and Bahama, prior to running into the British force.

Don José de Córdoba and the Spanish fleet left Cartagena on 1 February and might have reached Cádiz safely but for a fierce Levanter, the easterly wind, blowing between Gibraltar and Cádiz, which pushed the Spanish fleet further out into the Atlantic than intended. As the winds died down, the fleet began working its way back to Cádiz. In the meantime, the British Mediterranean Fleet, under Admiral Sir John Jervis, had sailed from the Tagus with ten ships of the line to try to intercept the Spanish fleet. On 6 February, Jervis was joined off Cape St. Vincent by a reinforcement of five ships of the line from the Channel Fleet under Rear-Admiral William Parker. On 11 February, the British frigate HMS Minerve, under the command of Commodore Horatio Nelson, passed through the Spanish fleet unseen thanks to heavy fog. Nelson reached the British fleet of fifteen ships off Spain on 13 February, and passed the location of the Spanish fleet to Jervis, commanding the fleet from his flagship Victory. Unaware of the size of his opponent's fleet—in the fog, Nelson had not been able to count them—Jervis's squadron immediately sailed to intercept. Unaware of the British presence, the Spanish continued toward Cádiz. Early on the 14th, Jervis learnt that the Spanish fleet was 35 miles to windward.

Battle
 During the night came the sounds that the British fleet had been waiting to hear – the signal guns of the Spanish ships in the fog. At 2:50 a.m. came the report that the Spanish fleet was some fifteen miles distant. By early morning, at 5:30 a.m., Niger reported them to be closer still. As the dawn came, it brought a cold and foggy February morning. In the increasing light, Jervis saw his fleet around him, formed into two lines of battle. He turned to his officers on the quarter-deck of Victory and said, "A victory to England is very essential at this moment." Jervis gave orders for the fleet to prepare for the coming action. Captain Thomas Troubridge in Culloden was in the lead. At 6:30 a.m., Culloden signalled that she could see five enemy sail to the south east, and then with Blenheim and Prince George turned toward the Spanish ships. Jervis had no idea of the size of the fleet he was up against. As they loomed up out of the fog, a signal lieutenant in Barfleur described them as "thumpers, looming like Beachy Head in a fog." As dawn broke, Jervis's ships were in position to engage the Spanish. On the quarter-deck of Victory, Jervis, Captain Robert Calder and Captain Benjamin Hallowell counted the ships. It was at this point Jervis discovered that he was outnumbered nearly two-to-one.

Seeing that it would be difficult to disengage, Jervis decided to continue because the situation would only get worse were the Spanish fleet to join up with the French. Meanwhile, the Canadian Captain Hallowell became so excited that he thumped the Admiral on the back, "That's right Sir John, and, by God, we'll give them a damn good licking!" As the light grew, it became obvious that the Spanish ships were formed in two loose columns, one of about 18 ships to windward and the other, of about nine ships, somewhat closer to the British. At about 10:30 a.m., the Spanish ships in the weather column were seen to wear ship and turn to port. This gave the impression that they might form a line and pass along the weather column of the British fleet, exposing the smaller British column to the fire of the larger Spanish division. At 11:00 a.m., Jervis gave his order: "Form in a line of battle ahead and astern of Victory as most convenient." When this order was completed the British fleet had formed a single line of battle, sailing in a southerly direction on a course to pass between the two Spanish columns. At 11:12 a.m., Jervis made his next signal: "Engage the enemy" and then at 11:30 a.m.: "Admiral intends to pass through enemy lines". The Battle of Cape St. Vincent had begun.

To the British advantage, the Spanish fleet was formed into two groups and was unprepared for battle, while the British were already in line. Jervis ordered the British fleet to pass between the two groups, minimising the fire they could put into him, while letting him fire in both directions

Culloden tacked to reverse her course and take after the Spanish column. Blenheim and then Prince George did the same in succession. The Spanish lee division now put about to the port tack with the intention of breaking the British line at the point where the ships were tacking in succession. Orion came round but Colossus was in the course of going about when her foreyard and foretop yard were shot away. She was forced to wear ship instead of tack and the leading Spanish vessel came close enough to threaten her with a broadside. Saumarez in Orion saw the danger to his friends and backed his sails to give covering fire. As Victory came to the tacking point, another attempt was made to break the British line. Victory, however, was too fast and Principe de Asturias had to tack close to Victory and received two raking broadsides as she did so. "We gave them their Valentine in style," later wrote a gunner in Goliath. As the last ship in the British line passed the Spanish, the British line had formed a U shape with Culloden in the lead and on the reverse course but chasing the rear of the Spanish. At this point the Spanish lee division bore up to make an effort to join their compatriots to windward. Had they managed to do this, the battle would have ended indecisively and with the Spanish fleet running for Cádiz. The British ships would have been left harrying their sterns in much the manner of the Armada, 1588.

At 1:05 p.m., Jervis hoisted a signal:

Take suitable stations for mutual support and engage the enemy as coming up in succession

Nelson had returned to his own ship Captain (a seventy-four) and was now towards the rear of the British line, much closer to the larger group. He came to the conclusion that the manoeuvre could not be completed so as to allow the British to catch them. Unless the movements of the Spanish ships could be thwarted, everything so far gained would be lost. Interpreting Jervis' signal loosely, and disobeying previous orders, Nelson gave orders to Captain Ralph Miller to wear ship and to take Captain out of line while engaging the smaller group.

As soon as the seventy-four was around, Nelson directed her to pass between Diadem and Excellent and ran across the bows of the Spanish ships forming the central group of the weather division. This group included the Santísima Trinidad, the largest ship afloat at the time and mounting 130 guns, the San José, 112, Salvador del Mundo, 112, San Nicolás, 84, San Ysidro 74 and the Mexicano 112.

Nelson's decision to wear ship was significant. As a junior commander, he was subject to the orders of his Commander in Chief (Admiral Jervis); in taking this action he was acting against the "form line ahead and astern of Victory" order and using his own wide interpretation of "take suitable stations" in the later signal. Had the action failed, he would have been subject to court-martial for disobeying orders in the face of the enemy, with subsequent loss of command and disgrace.

At about 1:30 p.m., Culloden was gradually overhauling the Spanish rear and began a renewed but not very close engagement of the same group of ships. Jervis signalled his rearmost ship, Excellent to come to the wind on the larboard tack and following this order, Collingwood brought his ship round to a position ahead of Culloden. After a few more minutes, Blenheim and Prince George came up behind and the group of British ships prevented the Spanish from grouping together.

The Captain was now under fire from as many as six Spanish ships, of which three were 112-gun three-deckers and a fourth Córdoba's 130-gun flagship Santísima Trinidad. At about 2:00 p.m., Culloden had stretched so far ahead as to cover the Captain from the heavy fire poured into her by the Spanish four-decker and her companions, as they hauled up and brought their broadsides to bear. Of the respite thus afforded to her, the Captain took immediate advantage, replenishing her lockers with shot and splicing and repairing her running rigging.

At about 2:30, Excellent having been directed by signal to bear up, edged away and at 2:35, arriving abreast of the disabled Spanish three-decker Salvator del Mundo, engaged the latter on her weather bow for a few minutes; then passing on to the next Spanish ship in succession, the San Ysidro, whose three topmasts had already been shot away. This ship Captain Collingwood engaged closely until 2:50 when, after a gallant defence in her crippled state, the San Ysidro hauled down the Spanish flag.

Moments later, Excellent and Diadem commenced an attack on the Salvator del Mundo, with Excellent stationing herself on the weather bow and Diadem on the lee quarter of the Spanish three-decker. Observing that the Victory was about to pass close astern, the Salvator del Mundo, which had more or less been disabled, judiciously hauled down her flag as soon as some of Victory's bow guns came to bear.

By about 3:00, Excellent was already in close action with San Nicolás which, with foretop mast shot away, had been in action against Captain. Excellent fired broadsides into San Nicolás and then made sail to clear ahead. To avoid Excellent, San Nicolás luffed up and ran foul of San José, which had suffered the loss of mizzen mast and other damage. Captain was by now almost uncontrollable with her wheel shot away. At this point, her foretop mast fell over the side leaving her in a completely unmanageable state and with little option but to board the Spanish vessels. Captain opened fire on the Spanish vessels with her larboard (port) side broadside and then put the helm over and hooked her larboard cat-head with the starboard quarter of San Nicolás.

At 3:20, with a cry of "Westminster Abbey or Glorious Victory!", Nelson ordered his boarders to cross the first Spanish ship onto the second. He later wrote,

The soldiers of the 69th, with an alacrity which will ever do them credit, and Lieutenant Pearson of the same regiment, were almost the foremost on this service – the first man who jumped into the enemy's mizen chains was Commander Berry, late my First Lieutenant (Captain Miller was in the very act of going also, but I directed him to remain); he was supported from our sprit sail yard, which hooked in the mizen rigging. A soldier of the 69th Regiment having broken the upper quarter-gallery window, I jumped in myself, and was followed by others as fast as possible. I found the cabin doors fastened, and some Spanish officers fired their pistols: but having broke open the doors the soldiers fired, and the Spanish Brigadier fell, as retreating to the quarter-deck. I pushed immediately onwards for the quarter-deck, where I found Commander Berry in possession of the poop, and the Spanish ensign hauling down. I passed with my people, and Lieutenant Pearson, on the larboard gangway, to the forecastle, where I met two or three Spanish officers, prisoners to my seamen: they delivered me their swords. A fire of pistols, or muskets, opening from the stern gallery of the San Josef, I directed the soldiers to fire into her stern; and calling to Captain Miller, ordered him to send more men into the San Nicolas; and directed my people to board the first-rate, which was done in an instant, Commander Berry assisting me into the main chains. At this moment a Spanish officer looked over the quarter deck rail, and said they surrendered. From this most welcome intelligence, it was not long before I was on the quarter deck, where the captain, with a bow, presented me his sword, and said the admiral was dying of his wounds. I asked him on his honour if the ship was surrendered. He declared she was: on which I gave him my hand, and desired him to call on his officers and ship's company and tell them of it: which he did – and on the quarter deck of a Spanish first-rate, extravagant as the story may seem, did I receive the swords of vanquished Spaniards: which as I received, I gave to William Fearney, one of my bargemen, who put them, with the greatest sang-froid, under his arm.

Both Spanish vessels were successfully captured. This manoeuvre was so unusual and so widely admired in the Royal Navy that using one enemy ship to cross to another became known facetiously as "Nelson's patent bridge for boarding enemy vessels."

By the time Santísima Trinidad had struck her colours to surrender, Infante Don Pelayo and San Pablo, separated from de Córdoba's group during the action, having been dispatched by the commander at 8.00 a.m. on the morning to investigate guns heard to the north, sailed in and bore down on Diadem and Excellent.  Infante Don Pelayo'''s captain Cayetano Valdés warned Santísima Trinidad to fly her flag again under threat she would be deemed an enemy ship and raked. The Spanish four-decker raised her flag. She was saved from being captured by the British.

By 4:00, the Spanish ship Santísima Trinidad was relieved by two of her escorts and made away from the scene. Admiral Moreno's squad put together the survivors of Córdoba's group and turned to assist the harassed Spanish sails. Jervis signalled his fleet to cover the prizes and disabled vessels and at 4:15 the frigates were directed to take the prizes in tow. At 4:39 the fleet was ordered to take station in line astern of Victory. The battle was by now almost over with only some remaining skirmishing between Britannia, Orion and the departing Spanish covering Santísima Trinidad (which was to later be captured at the Battle of Trafalgar).

Nelson remained on board the captured Spanish ships while they were made secure – and was cheered by the British ships as they passed. He returned to the Captain to thank Captain Miller and presented him with the sword of the captain of the San Nicolás.

At 5:00, Nelson shifted his pennant from the disabled Captain to Irresistible. The Battle of Cape St. Vincent had cost the lives of 73 men of the Royal Navy and wounded a further 227 (this figure only includes serious injuries). Casualties amongst the Spanish ships were far higher – aboard San Nicolás alone 144 were killed. Then, still black with smoke and with his uniform in shreds, Nelson went on board Victory where he was received on the quarter-deck by Admiral Jervis – "the Admiral embraced me, said he could not sufficiently thank me, and used every kind expression which could not fail to make me happy."

It was a great and welcome victory for the Royal Navy – fifteen British ships had defeated a Spanish fleet of 27, and the Spanish ships had a greater number of guns and men. But, Admiral Jervis had trained a highly disciplined force and this was pitted against an inexperienced Spanish Navy under Don José Córdoba. The Spanish men fought fiercely but without direction. After the San José was captured it was found that some of her guns still had their tampions in the muzzles. The confusion amongst the Spanish fleet was so great that they were unable to use their guns without causing more damage to their own ships than to the British.

Aftermath
Jervis had given orders to destroy the four prizes had the action restarted. Several days later, the frigate  (32) spotted the damaged Santísima Trinidad making her way back to Spain. The captain, Orozco, now commissioned by de Cordoba, had flown his flag in frigate Diana. Terpsichore engaged but kept always out of range from the stern guns of the ship anytime Santísima Trinidad bore down on the English frigate. Terpsichore nonetheless was hit twice with those cannons in a sudden move, resulting in damage in her rigging, masts and sails as well as some impacts on her hull. Captain Richard Bowen then ordered to keep the pursuit but from a longer distance until the frigate vanished away. In the battle as a whole, the British casualties were 73 killed, 227 badly wounded, and about 100 lightly wounded. The Spanish casualties were about 1,000 men killed or wounded. While the British fleet lay at Lagos Bay, in Portugal, the Spanish prisoners received from the four prizes, numbering about 3000, were landed. Jervis was made Baron Jervis of Meaford and Earl St Vincent. Nelson was knighted as a member of the Order of the Bath. Nelson's promotion to Rear-Admiral was not a reward for his services, but simply a happy coincidence: promotion to flag rank in the Navy of the time was based on seniority on the Captain's list and not on achievement. The now Earl St Vincent was granted a pension for life of £3,000 per year.

The City of London presented him with the Freedom of the City in a gold box valued at 100 guineas and awarded both him and Nelson a ceremonial sword.Gold City of London Freedom Box presented to Vice-Admiral Sir John Jervis, held in the collections of the National Maritime Museum, Greenwich  The presentation box and sword are both currently held at the National Maritime Museum, Greenwich. The two swords awarded Jervis and Nelson were the first of their kind to be issued by the City of London.Tucker. Vol. 2, p.86 St Vincent was awarded the thanks of both Houses of Parliament and given a gold medal by the King. The London Gazette published an advertisement in 1798 regarding the prize money that was due to the officers and men who had fought at the battle. The sum quoted was £140,000 of which, as admiral, Jervis was entitled to a sizable share. In 1847 the Admiralty authorized the issuance of the Naval General Service Medal with clasp "St. Vincent" to all surviving claimants from the battle. Cordóba was dismissed from the Spanish Navy and forbidden from appearing at court. Jervis resumed his blockade of the Spanish fleet in Cadiz.Tucker. Vol. 1, p.272 The continuation of the blockade for most of the following three years, largely curtailed the operations of the Spanish fleet until the Peace of Amiens in 1802. The containment of the Spanish threat, and the further reinforcement of his command, enabled Jervis to send a squadron under Nelson back into the Mediterranean the following year. That squadron, including Saumarez's Orion, Troubridge's Culloden, and the Goliath, now under Foley, re-established British command of the Mediterranean at the Battle of the Nile.

Order of battle
British fleet

Other British vessels

Spanish fleet

References

Works cited
 
 
 
 

General references
 
 
 Christopher Lloyd, St. Vincent & Camperdown''. Batsford, 1963.
 Rif Winfield, British Warships in the Age of Sail 1793–1817: Design, Construction, Careers and Fates. 2nd edition, Seaforth Publishing, 2008. . Book.

External links

 
 

Conflicts in 1797
French Revolutionary Wars orders of battle
Horatio Nelson
Cape St. Vincent (1797)
Cape St. Vincent 1797
Cape St. Vincent 1797